Arjun Charan Sethi (18 September 1941 – June 8, 2020) was an Indian politician who represented Bhadrak constituency in Odisha in Lok Sabha 8 times. Over his career, he belonged first to Congress Party, later to Biju Janata Dal, and finally BJP at the time of his death.

In 1971, he was elected to the Lok Sabha from Bhadrak as a Congress candidate for the first time. He was re-elected in 1980 from the same constituency as an Indian National Congress (I) candidate. He was re-elected to the Lok Sabha in 1991 as a Janata Dal candidate from the same constituency. He was re-elected to the Lok Sabha in 1998, 1999, 2004 and 2009 from the same constituency as a Biju Janata Dal candidate. He was the Union Minister of water resources in Atal Bihari Vajpayee led government from 2000 to 2004.

In 2019, he left Biju Janata Dal to join Bharatiya Janata Party with his son Abhimanyu Sethi. He died on 8 June 2020, in a hospital in Bhubaneswar.

See also
 Indian general election in Orissa, 2009

References

External links
Biography
Additional biography

1941 births
2020 deaths
Lok Sabha members from Odisha
Biju Janata Dal politicians
India MPs 1971–1977
India MPs 1980–1984
India MPs 1991–1996
India MPs 1998–1999
India MPs 1999–2004
India MPs 2004–2009
India MPs 2009–2014
India MPs 2014–2019
People from Bhadrak
People from Bhadrak district
Janata Dal politicians
Bharatiya Janata Party politicians from Odisha
Indian National Congress politicians from Odisha
Deaths from the COVID-19 pandemic in India